Tatyana Vladimirovna Kotova (born 11 December 1976) is a track and field athlete who competed for Russia in the long jump. Her personal best jump of 7.42 m at Annecy in 2002, is the best distance achieved by a female long jumper in the 21st century (as of 2023).

Kotova won bronze medals in the event at the 2000 and 2004 Olympic Games. She won three consecutive silver medals at the World Championships in Athletics from 2001 to 2005, also taking bronze in 2007. She had even greater success indoors, where she won the World Indoor Championships on three occasions, in 1999, 2003 and 2006, as well as finishing as runner-up in 2001 and 2004. She was later stripped of her 2005 World silver and 2006 World Indoor title. Her other titles include wins at the 2002 European Championships and the 2002 IAAF World Cup. She was third at the 2001 Goodwill Games and was the jackpot winner of the 2000 IAAF Golden League.

Life and career
Kotova was born in Kokand, Uzbek SSR, and grew up in Taboshar, Tajik SSR. She started to take up track and field in 1995, previously also practicing volleyball and basketball. Training in Barnaul, West Siberia, Kotova won a gold medal at the European U23 Championships in Turku, Finland, and in 1999 got a gold medal at the World Indoors in Maebashi. She was injured in a car accident in August 2000, and went on to finish fourth less than two months later at the 2000 Olympic Games in Sydney.

Doping
Kotova managed to both win and lose medals due to doping. In the 2000 Olympics, she had initially finished fourth. She was promoted to the bronze medal nine years later, after original bronze medal winner Marion Jones admitted usage of performance-enhancing drugs during the Olympics. However, in 2013, samples from the 2005 World Championships were retested and Kotova was found to have been doping. She was stripped of her silver medal at the World Championships, and also of the gold on the 2005 IAAF World Athletics Final, with Anju Bobby George promoted to first.

International competitions

See also
List of doping cases in athletics
List of Olympic medalists in athletics (women)
List of medal sweeps in Olympic athletics
List of 2000 Summer Olympics medal winners
List of 2004 Summer Olympics medal winners
List of World Athletics Championships medalists (women)
List of medal sweeps at the World Athletics Championships
List of IAAF World Indoor Championships medalists (women)
List of European Athletics Championships medalists (women)
Long jump at the Olympics
Russia at the World Athletics Championships
Doping at the World Athletics Championships

References

External links
 Tatyana Kotova Pictures

1976 births
Living people
People from Kokand
Russian female long jumpers
Olympic female long jumpers
Olympic athletes of Russia
Olympic bronze medalists for Russia
Olympic bronze medalists in athletics (track and field)
Athletes (track and field) at the 2000 Summer Olympics
Athletes (track and field) at the 2004 Summer Olympics
Athletes (track and field) at the 2008 Summer Olympics
Medalists at the 2000 Summer Olympics
Medalists at the 2004 Summer Olympics
Goodwill Games medalists in athletics
Competitors at the 2001 Goodwill Games
Athletes stripped of World Athletics Championships medals
World Athletics Championships athletes for Russia
World Athletics Championships medalists
World Athletics Indoor Championships winners
IAAF Continental Cup winners
European Athletics Championships winners
European Athletics Championships medalists
Russian Athletics Championships winners
IAAF Golden League winners
Doping cases in athletics
Russian sportspeople in doping cases